is a railway station on the Kashii Line operated by JR Kyushu in Sue, Fukuoka Prefecture, Japan.

Lines

Station layout 
The station, which is unstaffed, consists of a side platform serving a single track. The station building is of modern construction with tiled roof and houses a small waiting area and automatic ticket machines. A bike shed is provided next to the station building and another one on the station forecourt opposite.

Adjacent stations

History
The station was opened by JR Kyushu on 11 March 1989 as an additional station on the existing track of the Kashii Line.

On 14 March 2015, the station, along with others on the line, became a remotely managed "Smart Support Station". Under this scheme, although the station became unstaffed, passengers using the automatic ticket vending machines or ticket gates could receive assistance via intercom from staff at a central support centre.

Passenger statistics
In fiscal 2016, the station was used by an average of 1,384 passengers daily (boarding passengers only), and it ranked 127th among the busiest stations of JR Kyushu.

References

External links
Sue-Chūō (JR Kyushu)

Railway stations in Fukuoka Prefecture
Railway stations in Japan opened in 1989